The Odour Special Interest Group (OSIG) is a sub-committee of the Clean Air Society of Australia and New Zealand and provides forums for the exchange of information, encouraging improved practices in odour measurement, dispersion modelling, assessment, control, management and monitoring of odour effects.

The current OSIG Chair is Michasel Assal of The Odour Unit. When required, the OSIG reforms one or all of its four subcommittees. These are responsible for investigating and developing approaches in regard to Odour Sampling, Odour Modelling Approaches, Community Impact Tools and specifying Separation Distances. The aims of these committees are to help develop methods and approaches for assessing potential odour impacts that are transparent and can be cited as officially accepted by air quality professionals within Australia and New Zealand.

External links 
 The OSIG page of the CASANZ website
 Presentations and notes from the June 2006 OSIG meeting, Coolangatta

Environmental organisations based in Australia
Environmental organisations based in New Zealand
Air pollution in New Zealand